Ahmet Yalçınkaya (born December 1963) is a Turkish poet and academician.

Born in Giresun, Turkey, and grew up in Germany. Has studied Engineering, Robotics, management and business at various universities in Turkey, USA, Uzbekistan and Sweden. He lived in Europe, Turkey, and Central Asia. Lives and works today in Turkmenistan, and continues his studies, research, and teachings in Sweden.

His poems, essays, letters, interviews, poetry translations have been published by newspapers and journals like Zaman, Al-Ahram Weekly, Impact, Avaz, Harman, Das Licht, Maveran, Yosh Kuch, Kiragi, Endulus, Poezia, Carmina Balcanica and others in Turkey, Germany, England, Egypt, Romania and Uzbekistan. Has been awarded with several prizes. Has represented Kiragi (Hoarfrost) Poetry Journal in Istanbul (1995–97). Has taken part in the editorial board of the literary journal Endulus (Andalusia) (1997–98). Edited and published for a short time (1995) the literary journal Mevsim (The Season).

Some of his poems have been translated into languages such as English, Uzbek, Arabic, Tamil, Turkmen language, Azerbaijani, Romanian, German, and published abroad.

Works
 Daglarda Yer Yok (Poems, 1997, "There is not any place in the mountains"), .
 Yetim Kalan Siirler (Poems, 2001, "Orphan Poems")
 Yuragimning ko`z yoshi (Selected Poems, 2001, in Uzbek, "Tears of my Heart"), .
 Özlem Sularında (Selected Poems, "In the Waters of Longing", e-book, 2004, printed, 2005), .
 Poems of the Night (Anthology, with Richard Mildstone, 2005, 2008, .)

In addition to the above literary works, has also works in technical and management fields.

Sources
 [Işık, İhsan ; Türkiye Edebiyatçılar ve Kültür Adamları Ansiklopedisi 10 Cilt, Elvan Yayınları; Ankara, 2006, .]
 
 [Özbay, Adem ; Türk Şiiri Antolojisi, Sarmaşık Yayınları, İstanbul, 2001.]
 [Ünlü, Özcan; Yüz Yıllık Türk Şiir Atlası, 2 Cilt, Birey Yayıncılık, İstanbul, 2004.]
 [Durman, Nurettin; Filistin Şiirleri Antolojisi,Anka Yayınları,İstanbul,Haziran 2001,.]
 [Kasır, H.Ali; Çocuk Şiirleri, Düşün Yayınları; Çocuk Kitapları,İstanbul, 2000.] .]
 [Naz, Necmi; Çağdaş Anadolu Türk Edebiyatı Çocuk Şiirleri Antolojisi, X Yayınları, İstanbul, 2003, .]
 [İzdüşüm II, Anafilya, havuz.de, 2005, Netherlands.]
[Shodmanov, Alisher; "Shoir bilan muloqat", Pop Tongi, Namangan, Uzbekistan, 8 va 10 Iyun 2001, p. 8]
[Marutham, Adhavan; "Turkish and Uzbek Poetry: Examples", Bharathiar University, 2008, Tamil Nadu, India]

External links
 Personal blog of the poet
 
 
 
 
 
 
 :fr:Université technique d'Istanbul
 
 
 
 Kabatas Erkek Lisesi

Turkish non-fiction writers
Turkish scientists
Turkish roboticists
Turkish academics
People from Giresun
Istanbul Technical University alumni
Turkish poets
Living people
1963 births
Kabataş Erkek Lisesi alumni
Boğaziçi University alumni
Turkish mechanical engineers